Reverend Horace L. Griffin is an Episcopal minister and gay man.  Griffin is the author of Their Own Receive Them Not: African American Lesbian and Gays in Black Churches, which was released in October 2006.

See also

LGBT topics and Afro-Americans in the Americas
Homosexuality and Christianity

External links
 Article on Their Own Receive Them Not in therawstory.

Year of birth missing (living people)
Living people
American gay writers
African-American Christian clergy
American Christian clergy
African-American writers
American writers
American Episcopal priests
LGBT African Americans
LGBT Anglican clergy
21st-century African-American people
African-American male writers